Abu Muḥammad al-Faḍl ibn Shadhan ibn Khalil al-Azdi al-Naysaburi, better known as al-Faḍl ibn Shadhan (died 260 AH/873 AD) was an Arab Muslim traditionist, jurist, and theologian. He was highly regarded by the Imami Shi'a as one of the leading Imāmī scholars of his time.

Life 
Little is known about his life. He was probably born at the end of the 2nd century AH (791-816 AD). He lived and grew up in Nishapur, as his nisbah al-Azdi indicates; he belonged to the Arab tribe of Azd. He was the son of Shadhan ibn Khalil, a well known Imami traditionalist. Al-Fadl and his family migrated to Baghdad when he was young, where he began his education, and later relocated to the neighboring city of Kufa, and then finally to Wasit. Al-Fadl studied under prominent scholars such as Al-Ḥasan ibn Al-Faddal, Nasr ibn Muzahim, Safwan ibn Yahya and Hammad ibn Isa, and was also recorded to have been a disciple of the Twelver Imam Ali al-Ridha. After spending years in Iraq, al-Fadl returned to Nishapur and continued his educational activities, until he was exiled by the Tahirid government for reportedly practicing Shi'ism. However, the sentence did not last for long. During his exile, he stayed in hiding in Bayhaq, a town near Nishapur. While in hiding, he became ill, and eventually died in 873 or 874 AD. A mausoleum dedicated to him is located in Nishapur.

References

See also 
 List of pre-modern Arab scientists and scholars
 Seyed Khorasani and signs of the appearance of the Mahdi

9th-century Arabs
9th-century jurists
9th-century people from the Abbasid Caliphate
873 deaths
Year of birth unknown
Shia scholars of Islam
Muhaddiths from Nishapur